Absence is the third and final album for Australian band, Snowman. It was released on 3 June 2011 via Dot Dash Recordings. It was produced by Snowman and Aaron Cupples (The Drones, Dan Kelly, Paul Kelly) at various locations around London. Upon the release of the album, Snowman announced their split.

About the creative process behind the album, Joe McKee stated:

Track listing
All the words and music were written by Snowman.
 "Snakes & Ladders" – 3:58
 "Hyena" – 3:14
 "White Wall" – 4:10
 "Séance" – 5:00
 "∆ (A)" – 6:08
 "Memory Lost" – 5:27
 "A Vanishing Act" – 6:08
 "Absence" – 6:30

References

2011 albums
Snowman (band) albums
Dot Dash Recordings albums